Franco Ezequiel Gómez (born 8 May 1994) is an Argentine professional footballer who plays as a midfielder for Colegiales.

Career
Gómez played for Primera D Metropolitana side Atlas for two years from 2016, scoring one goal in forty-six appearances for the club. On 30 June 2018, Gómez completed a move to Colegiales of Primera B Metropolitana. He didn't start appearing for their senior team until mid-November, with the midfielder making his debut during a 1–1 draw with Tristán Suárez on 17 November. Further appearances against Talleres and Atlanta arrived later that month.

Career statistics
.

References

External links

1994 births
Living people
Place of birth missing (living people)
Argentine footballers
Association football midfielders
Primera D Metropolitana players
Primera B Metropolitana players
Club Atlético Atlas footballers
Club Atlético Colegiales (Argentina) players